ChiZo Rising is a collectable tile game that combines the elements of a collectable game with a German-style board game. The game’s name is created by shortening the words Chinese zodiac to ‘ChiZo’. The Chinese zodiac is the inspiration for the game’s theme and game play.

References

External links
 Temple Games' ChiZo Rising website and forums
 

Board games introduced in 2005
Tile-based board games